Mangoes is a Pakistani Canadian television series directed by Khurram Suhrwardy and produced by Adeel Suhrwardy and Khurram Suhrwardy under the production banner of Suhrwardy Brothers. The story revolves around the lives of young South Asians living in Canada. The series was first premiered on 27 June 2012 on ATN Canada and it ended after seven episodes. The second season began on 29 September 2016 on ATN. The third season Mangoes: a slice of life began in September 2019 on YouTube.

Plot
The story revolves around a group of three friends 2 from Pakistan and 1 from India and their lives in Toronto, Ontario, Canada.

Cast and characters

Main cast
 Adeel Suhrwardy as Sami
 Maha Warsi as Asha
 Khurram Suhrwardy as Rakkay

Theme song
Keh Dena is the theme song for the series and has become very popular after its release in November 2011. On YouTube the official video of the song has been viewed more than 500,000 times.

It was sung by Canadian singer Kristie Yung as a tribute to Pakistani singer Alamgir. The latter performs the song together with Yung.
It was originally recorded by Alamgir in the 80s and was included in his album "Alamgir Sings For Himself"

References

External links
 Mangoes official website

Urdu-language television shows
2012 Canadian television series debuts
South Asian Canadian culture
2010s Canadian drama television series